The yellow-spotted fanray (Platyrhina tangi) is a species of electric ray in the family Platyrhinidae.

Taxonomy and etymology
The yellow-spotted fanray was described by Y. Iwatsuki, J. Zhang and K. Nakaya in 2011 as one of the three species in the genus Platyrhina. It is classified in the genus due to the patches of yellow on its central disc and thorns close to its orbit. Its specific name tangi is named after D.-S. Tang, a Chinese ichthyologist. Its holotype is located in Miyazaki, Japan. The species' closest relative is Platyrhina hyugaensis, the Hyuga fanray, due to the similarity of the two rays' thorn patterns.

Description
The yellow-spotted fanray is primarily brown on its upper side, ranging from a darker to a grayer shade, and white on its underside, often containing patches of grey. Unlike the rest of its disk, the thorns at the front of its body are bordered with yellow. Its fins are a dull shade of yellow, with its pectoral and pelvic fins grey on the outside.

Behavior and habitat
A benthic species, the yellow-spotted fanray lives in temperate waters in the pelagic and neritic zones, in areas where the sea floor is rocky or sandy. An ovoviviparous species, it can give birth during the fall or late summer, any time from August to November. Little else is known about the biology of the species. The species' diet was studied in detail in September 2012 by the Environmental Biology of Fishes, which found that the ray's most common food was shrimp and that it also ate mysids and fish. The study also discovered multiple other statistics about its eating. Males mature at  TDL and can live to be a maximum of 5 years old.

Distribution
The yellow-spotted fanray lives in various countries in the northwestern Pacific Ocean area from Vietnam to Japan, specifically in China, Taiwan, northern Vietnam, southern Korea, and southern Japan.

References

Torpediniformes
Taxa named by Yukio Iwatsuki
Taxa named by Zhang Jie (ichthyologist)
Taxa named by Kazuhiro Nakaya
Fish described in 2011
Fish of the North Pacific